Clostera strigosa, the striped chocolate-tip or drab tent-maker moth, is a species of moth in the family Notodontidae (the prominents). It was first described by Augustus Radcliffe Grote in 1882 and it is found in North America.

The MONA or Hodges number for Clostera strigosa is 7898.

References

Further reading

 
 
 

Notodontidae
Articles created by Qbugbot
Moths described in 1882